Pratten is a surname, and may refer to:

 Bert Pratten (1892–1979), Australian cricketer
 Frederick Pratten (cricketer) (1904–1967), English cricketer
 Graham Pratten (1899–1977), Australian politician 
 Herbert Pratten (1865–1928), Australian politician
 Robert Pratten, consultant
 Robert Sidney Pratten (1824–1868), English flautist

Other
 Pratten, Queensland, a town in Queensland, Australia
 Prattens, a company from Midsomer Norton, Somerset, that made pre-fabricated classrooms and other buildings